Alan Dunn (1900–1974) was a cartoonist known for his work in The New Yorker. He also had architectural expertise and submitted work to the magazine Architectural Record. He was married to fellow cartoonist Mary Petty.

Dunn studied at Columbia University, the National Academy of Design and the American Academy in Rome.

He eventually became The New Yorker's most prolific illustrator, creating nine covers and nearly 2000 cartoons over 47 years.

A cartoon of his is credited with inspiring the Fermi Paradox.

Dunn and Petty donated their papers to Syracuse University.

Books
 96 pp.

 128 pp.
 96 pp.
 168 pp.

 102 pp.
 118 pp.
 159 pp.
 144 pp.
 36 pp.

References

External links
Alan Dunn and Mary Petty Papers 1907–1972 at Syracuse University (primary source material)

1900 births
1974 deaths
American cartoonists
National Academy of Design alumni